Ivan Toplak (Serbian Cyrillic: Иван Toплaк; 21 September 1931 – 25 July 2021) was a Serbian football player and manager. Toplak played for NK Olimpija Ljubljana and Red Star Belgrade, with whom he had much success. As a player he also represented the Yugoslavia national team. As a manager he also managed Red Star, had a managing period in the United States, managed almost all levels of the Yugoslav national team and also managed the Indonesia national team.

At the 1984 Summer Olympics, he guided Yugoslavia to a bronze medal.

Club career
Toplak started his career at NK Branik Maribor in Maribor, where his family moved in 1943 from Belgrade.

In 1951, he signed with NK Olimpija Ljubljana, where he spent playing the next three years.

With Olimpija, he won the Slovenian Republic League in 1952.

In 1954, Toplak left Olimpija for Red Star Belgrade. He played at Red Star for seven years, until 1961. With Red Star he won the Yugoslav First League in the seasons 1955–56, 1956–57, 1958–59, 1959–60. He had also won the Yugoslav Cup in the 1957–58 season and the 1958–59 season. On international club level, he won the Mitropa Cup in 1958.

He left Red Star in 1961 and shortly after retired from football at the age of 30.

International career
Toplak earned one cap for the Yugoslavia national team in 1956, but did not score a goal in that game.

Managerial career
In 1964, Toplak became the new manager of Red Star Belgrade in the Yugoslav First League. He managed the club for two years, but did not manage to win anything.

After Yugoslavia, he went to the USA in 1967, where he managed the California Clippers from 1967 to 1968, Stanford University from 1969 to 1971 and the San Jose Earthquakes from 1974 to 1975.

In 1976 he left the US and came back to Yugoslavia, where from 1976 to 1977, he was manager of the Yugoslavia national team.

After the A team, he managed the Yugoslavia U20 and Yugoslavia U21 sides, both at the same time from 1978 to 1980. He led the U21 side at the 1980 UEFA Euro U21 Championship where he got the team to the semi-finals.

In 1984, he led the Yugoslavia U23 side at the 1984 Summer Olympics. He guided the team to third place.

In 1986 he was a co-manager of the Yugoslav national team, this time alongside Ivica Osim.

From 1991 to 1993, Toplak managed the Indonesia national team. In 1993, after leaving Indonesia, he announced his managerial retirement.

Death 
Toplak died on 25 July 2021 at the age of 89.

Honours

Player
Olimpija Ljubljana 
Slovenian Republic League: 1952

Red Star Belgrade 
Yugoslav First League: 1955–56, 1956–57, 1958–59, 1959–60
Yugoslav Cup: 1957–58, 1958–59
Mitropa Cup: 1958

Manager
Yugoslavia
Summer Olympics Third place: 1984

References

External links
Profile on Serbian federation official site

1931 births
2021 deaths
Footballers from Belgrade
Serbian footballers
Yugoslav footballers
Yugoslavia international footballers
Association football forwards
NK Olimpija Ljubljana (1945–2005) players
Red Star Belgrade footballers
Yugoslav First League players
Yugoslavia national football team managers
Yugoslav football managers
Yugoslav expatriate football managers
Serbian football managers
North American Soccer League (1968–1984) coaches
Indonesia national football team managers
Red Star Belgrade managers
San Jose Earthquakes (1974–1988) coaches
Expatriate soccer managers in the United States
Expatriate football managers in Indonesia
Serbia and Montenegro expatriate football managers
Yugoslav expatriate sportspeople in Indonesia
Yugoslav expatriate sportspeople in the United States